Deniz Öncü (born 26 July 2003) is a Turkish motorcycle racer, currently competing in the Moto3 World Championship, for team Red Bull KTM Tech3. His twin brother, Can Öncü, is also a motorcycle racer. Both brothers are mentored by Turkish multi-world champion motorcycle racer, Kenan Sofuoğlu.

Career

Early career 
Deniz, and his twin brother Can, competed in the Asia Talent Cup in 2016, Deniz finishing in 10th, and Can in 9th. They would compete again in 2017, Deniz becoming champion, and Can finishing 3rd. They both entered the 2017 Red Bull MotoGP Rookies Cup, Deniz finishing 4th, and Can in 3rd. Just like with the Asia Talent Cup, they would try again in 2018, Deniz finishing as runner-up this time, behind his brother Can who was crowned champion.

For 2018, as well as competing in the Red Bull Rookies Cup, both Can and Deniz joined Ajo Motorsport, and raced in the 2018 FIM CEV Moto3 Junior World Championship, Deniz finishing in 14th, and Can finishing in 7th with three podiums.

Moto3 World Championship

Red Bull KTM Ajo (2019)
In 2019, Deniz made two wildcard race appearances with Red Bull KTM Ajo after reaching the minimum age of 16 for the world championship class, finishing 18th in Germany, and 17th in the Czech Republic. Can had been permitted to race from the start of the season, despite being below the minimum age of 16, as he received a special dispensation by Dorna after winning the 2018 Red Bull MotoGP Rookies Cup, and the 2018 Valencian Grand Prix as a wildcard. Deniz replaced Can for a further three rounds, after Can suffered an injury at the Misano round, finishing in 16th, 24th, and 19th.

Red Bull KTM Tech3 (2020–2022)
For 2020, Deniz Öncü made his full season debut with Red Bull KTM Tech3. He achieved nine point scoring finishes, 50 points total, a season's best result being a 6th place in Valencia, and finished 17th in the riders' championship.

Öncü continued with Tech3 for the 2021 season, and he achieved his first Moto3 podium with a 3rd place finish in Barcelona, followed by two 2nd places in Austria and Aragon. He also scored his first Pole Position in Austria, but had to start from the back of the grid, because his Tech3 team elected to switch him to slick tyres, and finished just seconds after the three-minute board was shown. After the race in Austin, he was given a two race ban, after being deemed to have caused a massive incident involving clipping Jeremy Alcoba's front wheel, who went tumbling across the track, his bike being struck by Andrea Migno and Pedro Acosta, who both went airborne. Luckily all riders involved miraculously walked away from the incident unscathed, and Öncü was replaced by Daniel Holgado for the two race ban. Deniz finished the season with three podiums, 11th in the championship standings, and 95 points.

Return to Red Bull KTM Ajo (2023)
He will compete for Red Bull KTM Ajo with teammate José Antonio Rueda.

Career statistics

FIM CEV Moto3 Junior World Championship

Races by year
(key) (Races in bold indicate pole position, races in italics indicate fastest lap)

Red Bull MotoGP Rookies Cup

Races by year
(key) (Races in bold indicate pole position, races in italics indicate fastest lap)

Grand Prix motorcycle racing

By season

By class

Races by year
(key) (Races in bold indicate pole position; races in italics indicate fastest lap)

References

External links

Living people
2003 births
People from Alanya
Sportspeople from Antalya
Turkish sportsmen
Turkish motorcycle racers
Moto3 World Championship riders